The 2006 women's road cycling season was the first for the Lotto–Belisol Ladiesteam cycling team.

Roster

  Marielle Aunave 
  Claire Baxter   
  Liesbet De Vocht   
  Sofie De Vuyst
  Ludivine Henrion    
  Siobhan Horgan   
  Myriam Jacotey 
  Christa Pirard   
  Kim Schoonbaert   
  Inge Van Den Broeck   
  An Van Rie   
  Christine Verdaros   
  Grace Verbeke   
  Kathryn Watt  
Source

Season victories

Results in major races

UCI World Ranking

The team finished 17th in the UCI ranking for teams.

References

2006 UCI Women's Teams seasons
2006 in Belgian women's sport
Lotto–Soudal Ladies